Greeley Hill is a census-designated place in Mariposa County, California, United States. The 2020 United States census reported Greeley Hill's population as 927.

Geography 
The community is on the northern border of Mariposa County, with Tuolumne County to the north.

The town center is in a wide upland valley drained by Bean Creek, which flows east to the North Fork of the Merced River within Stanislaus National Forest.

Demographics 

The 2010 United States Census reported that Greeley Hill had a population of 915. The racial makeup of Greeley Hill was 847 (92.6%) White, 7 (0.8%) African American, 14 (1.5%) Native American, 1 (0.1%) Asian, 6 (0.7%) Pacific Islander, 11 (1.2%) from other races, and 29 (3.2%) from two or more races. Hispanic or Latino of any race were 53 persons (5.8%).

The Census reported that 915 people (100% of the population) lived in households, 0 (0%) lived in non-institutionalized group quarters, and 0 (0%) were institutionalized.

There were 418 households, out of which 81 (19.4%) had children under the age of 18 living in them, 222 (53.1%) were opposite-sex married couples living together, 30 (7.2%) had a female householder with no husband present, 26 (6.2%) had a male householder with no wife present.  There were 19 (4.5%) unmarried opposite-sex partnerships, and 6 (1.4%) same-sex married couples or partnerships. 111 households (26.6%) were made up of individuals, and 35 (8.4%) had someone living alone who was 65 years of age or older. The average household size was 2.19.  There were 278 families (66.5% of all households); the average family size was 2.61.

The population was spread out, with 139 people (15.2%) under the age of 18, 52 people (5.7%) aged 18 to 24, 129 people (14.1%) aged 25 to 44, 378 people (41.3%) aged 45 to 64, and 217 people (23.7%) who were 65 years of age or older.  The median age was 53.8 years. For every 100 females, there were 102.4 males.  For every 100 females age 18 and over, there were 101.0 males.

The homeowner vacancy rate was 1.0%; the rental vacancy rate was 11.5%.  675 people (73.8% of the population) lived in owner-occupied housing units and 240 people (26.2%) lived in rental housing units.

References 

Census-designated places in Mariposa County, California
Census-designated places in California